Číčenice is a municipality and village in Strakonice District in the South Bohemian Region of the Czech Republic. It has about 500 inhabitants.

Administrative parts

Villages of Strpí and Újezdec are administrative parts of Číčenice.

Geography
It lies in the České Budějovice Basin. There are several ponds in the territory.

History
The first written mention of Číčenice is from 1335.

Transport
The Číčenice railway station is an important junction of railroads České Budějovice–Plzeň and Týn nad Vltavou– Volary. There is also Újezdec u Číčenic railway station of local importance.

Sights
The landmark of Číčenice is the Church of Saint Wenceslaus, a neo-Gothic church from 1888.

References

External links

Villages in Strakonice District